Fernando Muñoz Benítez (born 27 July 1970) is a Spanish professional volleyball coach. He is the current head coach of Dinamo București.

Honours

Clubs
 CEV Challenge Cup
  2008/2009 – with Arkas İzmir
  2017/2018 – with Olympiacos

 National championships
 1999/2000  Spanish Cup, with CV Almería
 1999/2000  Spanish Championship, with CV Almería
 2000/2001  Spanish Championship, with CV Almería
 2001/2002  Spanish Cup, with CV Almería
 2001/2002  Spanish Championship, with CV Almería
 2002/2003  Spanish SuperCup, with CV Almería
 2002/2003  Spanish Championship, with CV Almería
 2003/2004  Spanish SuperCup, with CV Almería
 2003/2004  Spanish Championship, with CV Almería
 2006/2007  Turkish Championship, with Arkas İzmir
 2008/2009  Turkish Cup, with Arkas İzmir
 2017/2018  Greek League Cup, with Olympiacos
 2017/2018  Greek Championship, with Olympiacos
 2018/2019  Greek League Cup, with Olympiacos
 2018/2019  Greek Championship, with Olympiacos
 2022/2023  Romanian SuperCup, with Dinamo București

References

External links

 
 Coach profile at Volleybox.net

Living people
1970 births
Sportspeople from Madrid
Spanish volleyball coaches
Spanish expatriate sportspeople in Turkey
Spanish expatriate sportspeople in Greece
Spanish expatriate sportspeople in Belgium
Spanish expatriate sportspeople in Romania
Olympiacos S.C. coaches